Kematen in Tirol is a municipality in the district Innsbruck-Land located about 12 km west of Innsbruck. The Melach river flows into the Inn river in Kematen. Kematen was first mentioned as "Caminata" around 600.

Population

Geography 

Kematen is located in the Inn Valley, at the confluence of the Melach River (from the Sellrain Valley) into the River Inn. The municipal area lies mainly on the alluvial cone of the Melach south of the Inn. The Inn and Melach rivers form the northern and western boundaries of the municipality. Here lies the geographical (less the cultural) border between the Upper Inn Valley and the Lower Inn Valley.

History 

The village name Kematen probably goes back to the Latin caminata, which means "heated chamber". The place is first mentioned in documents around 1143 as "Kemenatin" in records of the Dießen Abbey founded by the Counts of Dießen-Andechs. The Wilten Abbey also had property in Kematen.

References

External links
 

Cities and towns in Innsbruck-Land District